"Heartless" is a song recorded by Canadian singer the Weeknd. It was released on November 27, 2019, through XO and Republic Records, as the lead single from his fourth studio album After Hours (2020). The Weeknd wrote and produced the song alongside Metro Boomin, Illangelo, and Dre Moon. The song combines R&B and trap with elements of electroclash.

"Heartless" received acclaim from critics, praising it for its production, catchiness and the Weeknd's vocals. It peaked at number three on the Canadian Hot 100. Elsewhere, the song topped the US Billboard Hot 100, giving the Weeknd his fourth number-one song on the chart, and also has figured within the record charts in other 28 countries and was the last new number one single of the 2010s. A vaporwave remix of the song featuring American rapper Lil Uzi Vert was released alongside the deluxe edition of its parent album on March 23, 2020. On April 3, 2020, an extended and normal-pitched version of the Lil Uzi Vert remix was released alongside the parent album's accompanying remix EP.

Background and release
The Weeknd first teased that he was working on a new album in November 2018, via a performance in which he told the crowd that "Chapter VI was coming soon." Following a trio of collaborative singles throughout 2019, on August 6, he further reassured fans that he was working on his fourth studio album. Then after a period of silence, on November 24 the single "Blinding Lights" was revealed through a Mercedes-Benz television commercial, with reports of "Heartless" surfacing a day later, along with its leaked cover art. It then premiered on the seventh episode of the Weeknd's Beats 1 radio show Memento Mori on November 27, 2019. In an interview with CR Men, the Weeknd confirmed that "Heartless" was the first song that he wrote for After Hours after the release of his 2018 EP My Dear Melancholy.

Lyrics
Lyrically, "Heartless" sees the Weeknd returning to his infamous party and playboy lifestyle after his disappointment with previous relationships. Throughout the song, he presents himself as a "heartless" person who engages in promiscuity and over-indulgence in drugs and alcohol.

Critical reception
The song was met with widespread acclaim, being praised for its production, catchiness and the Weeknd's vocals. It was ranked as the 39th best song of 2019 by Complex. On a statement discussing the single's position on the list, Jessica McKinney complimented the song's production and its unique vibe. On March 6, 2020, Entertainment Weekly named "Heartless" the Weeknd's 11th best single, stating that "everything about the song is colossal".

Accolades

Commercial performance
"Heartless" entered the Billboard Hot 100 at number 32 on the issue dated December 7, 2019, becoming the highest-debuting single of the week. The following week, it jumped 31 positions to the number one position on the chart, becoming the Weeknd's fourth number-one single in the United States. However, on the issue dated December 21, 2019, "Heartless" fell sixteen places out of the top ten to number 17 partly due to Christmas songs overtaking the upper half of the chart, becoming the biggest drop from the number-one spot in the chart's 61-year history. The song later returned to the top ten (at number four) after the release of After Hours on the issue dated April 4, 2020, its first week in the top ten since December 2019. On April 5, 2022, "Heartless" was awarded a 3x Platinum certification from the Recording Industry Association of America (RIAA) for selling two million units in the United States. It was the final new number one single of 2010s in the United States. 

On the Rolling Stone Top 100 Songs chart, the song debuted at number fourteen, lodging 11.1 million streams after two days of tracking. In its second week, The song ascended at number one, becoming the Weeknd's first number-one song on the chart.

In the singer's native Canada, "Heartless" reached number three on the Canadian Hot 100. In the United Kingdom, the song reached number ten, becoming the Weeknd's seventh top-10 hit in the country.

Music videos
An official vertical lyric video for the song was released on December 2, 2019. The video was shot in the Plaza Hotel and Casino in Las Vegas, Nevada; and Caesars Palace and Flamingo Las Vegas in Paradise, Nevada. The official music video for "Heartless" was released on December 3, 2019. The clip was also shot in Las Vegas, and stars the Weeknd and Metro Boomin. The video follows the two as they drunkenly explore casinos and parties, with the Weeknd later hallucinating after licking a frog. The video ends with the Weeknd running down Fremont Street and vomiting. It was directed by Anton Tammi and inspired by the cult film Fear and Loathing in Las Vegas. An official music video for the Lil Uzi Vert remix of the song was released on April 14, 2020, and it featured a montage of warped FHS footage and an anime version of the Weeknd throughout the visual.

Live performances
The debut live performance for "Heartless" occurred on December 5, 2019, on The Late Show with Stephen Colbert. The performance saw the Weeknd descend into the backstage corridors of the Ed Sullivan Theater as the walls of the building bend and shift around him. A performance of "Blinding Lights" occurred the day after on the same show.

Remix
The song's first official remix features rapper Lil Uzi Vert and is titled "Heartless (Vapor Wave Remix)". The Weeknd's vocals are chopped and screwed on the remix, while Lil Uzi's high-pitched vocals are also distorted. Complex's Jessica McKinney said of the collaboration, "After dropping two of the biggest albums of the year so far, it's clear both the Weeknd and Lil Uzi Vert are on a winning streak." A second non-vaporwave and extended version of the remix was released on April 3, 2020, alongside the remix EP After Hours (Remixes).

Credits and personnel
Credits adapted from the Weeknd's official website and Tidal.

 The Weeknd – vocals, songwriting, production, programming, keyboards
 Metro Boomin – songwriting, production, programming, keyboards
 Illangelo – songwriting, production, programming, keyboards, engineering, mixing
 Dre Moon – songwriting, co-production
 Shin Kamiyama – engineering
 Dave Kutch – mastering
 Kevin Peterson – mastering

Charts

Weekly charts

Year-end charts

Certifications

Release history

See also
List of Billboard Hot 100 number ones of 2019

Footnote

References

External links
 
 
 
 
 

2019 singles
2019 songs
Billboard Hot 100 number-one singles
Number-one singles in Greece
Song recordings produced by Metro Boomin
Songs written by Metro Boomin
Songs written by the Weeknd
The Weeknd songs
Song recordings produced by Illangelo
Songs written by Dre Moon
Songs written by Illangelo
Song recordings produced by the Weeknd
Republic Records singles
Trap music songs